Rafael Echenique (born 18 October 1980) is an Argentine professional golfer.

Early life and amateur career
Echenique was born in San Luis, Argentina. He won the Argentine Amateur Rankings in 1997/98.

Professional career
Echenique turned pro in 1999. Having failed to gain a place on the European Tour via the qualifying school on four occasions, he finally won a card on the main tour by virtue of finishing seventh on the 2006 Challenge Tour, helped by winning the Telia Challenge Waxholm in Sweden. He also finished second in the Apulia San Domenico Grand Final. Later that year he won the biggest title of his career, the Argentine Open in his home country.

Echenique's first year on the European Tour was highlighted by a second-place finish in the TCL Classic as he just did enough to retain his playing privileges for the following season. In 2008, a tie for fourth in the Celtic Manor Wales Open and seventh in the Omega European Masters, along with several other top twenty finishes, enabled him to sit more comfortably in 90th place on the Order of Merit. He was second in the 2000 Llao Llao Match Play, and the 2004 Argentine PGA Championship.

Echenique achieved the biggest result of his career at the 2009 BMW International Open, finishing runner-up to Nick Dougherty. Moving through the field on the final day, Echenique carded a final-round 10-under-par 62, which included an albatross at the par-5 18th hole, contributing to a European Tour record back-nine score of 27.

Amateur wins
 1997 Los Andes Cup
 1998 Center Open (Argentina), Junior World Championship (individual winner) (Japan)

Professional wins (7)

Challenge Tour wins (2)

1Co-sanctioned by the Tour de las Américas

TPG Tour wins (2)

Argentine wins (3)
 2001 Llao Llao Match Play
 2004 Salta Open
 2014 Bridgestone America's Golf Cup (with Emilio Domínguez)

Team appearances
Amateur
 Los Andes Cup: 1997 (winners)
 Eisenhower Trophy (representing Argentina): 1998

Professional
 World Cup (representing Argentina): 2009

See also
2006 Challenge Tour graduates
2016 European Tour Qualifying School graduates

External links
 
 
 

Argentine male golfers
PGA Tour Latinoamérica golfers
European Tour golfers
Argentine people of Basque descent
People from San Luis, Argentina
1980 births
Living people